The Project 58155 Gyurza-M class is a series of small armored gunboats in service with the Ukrainian Navy. The first two vessels were laid down at the Kuznia na Rybalskomu (previously Leninska Kuznia) shipbuilding plant in October 2012.  Originally it was planned to build nine such vessels by 2017.  In December 2013 the Ministry of Defence withdrew its contract. The class is named after the Levant viper, in Ukrainian.

In mid-2014 construction of the Gyurza-M class was revived and the first two vessels were launched in late 2015.  In December 2016 they officially joined the Ukrainian Navy. The new military contract for twenty vessels was to be completed by 2020.

Development and design 
The modernized Project 58155 Gurza-M for the Ukrainian Navy started to be built at the Leninska Kuznia in October 2012.<ref>Ukraine is completing creation of the River battle fleet. Agency of Strategic Research. 3 January 2013</ref> Originally it was planned to build nine such vessels by 2017. In December 2013 the Ministry of Defense withdrew its contract.

In summer of 2014 construction of Gurza-M was revived and the first two vessels were expected to be completed in fall of 2015. In December 2016 the first two Gurza-M officially joined the Ukrainian Navy. The new military contract is for 20 vessels that should be completed by 2020.

 Vessels 

 Operators 
 Ukrainian Navy: As of November 2022, 3 active; 3 captured by Russia; 1 sunk and then raised by Russia; 1 being tested. Previously, 2 ships of the class were captured by Russia and returned in 2018, were repaired and returned to active service in 2020. On 4 November 2022, a Gyurza-M-class gunboat of the Ukrainian Navy was damaged by a Lancet drone. The attack was recorded on video by another UAV.

 Incidents
 Kerch Strait incident 

On 25 November 2018, two Ukrainian Gyurza-M-class boats, Berdyansk and Nikopol were seized by the Russian Navy. They were captured while they tried to cross the Kerch Strait en route to Ukrainian port city of Mariupol in the Sea of Azov. During the incident, three Ukrainian crew members were injured. The ships were returned on 18 November 2019, but Ukraine accused Russia of returning them in sub-par condition.

 2022 Russian invasion of Ukraine 

Following the capture of Berdiansk by Russian forces, P 179-Vyshhorod and P 174-Akkerman were captured by Russian forces. Russian forces captured another two craft, P-177 Kremenchuk and P-178 Lubny'', during the Siege of Mariupol.

On 4 November 2022, a Gyurza-M-class gunboat of the Ukrainian Navy was damaged by a ZALA Lancet drone, the first time a Lancet attacked a naval target during the war.

See also 

 List of active Ukrainian Navy ships

Notes

References

External links 
 Gurza-M at the State Research and Design Shipbuilding Center
 Український флот отримав нові бойові кораблі
 На заводі "Кузня на Рибальському" спустили артилерійський катер "Гюрза-М"
 "Розбили пляшку шампанського": на воду спустили третій артилерійський катер Гюрза-М
 Церемонія спуску на воду малого артилерійського катера
 Gurza-M (Project 58155) Class Small Armoured Artillery Boats, Ukraine

Ships built at Kuznya na Rybalskomu
Patrol vessels of the Ukrainian Navy
Military boats
Gunboat classes